Kshemkari Mata temple is an old temple of Mother Goddess Kshemkari, also known as Khimaj Mata  situated on a [mountain], located at Latitude 24.998°N and Longitude 72.239°E, in Bhinmal, Jalore District of Rajasthan. It is 25 km from Sundha Mata Temple.

See also
Sundha Mata Temple
72 Jinalaya Temple

References

External links
 https://www.bhaskar.com/local/rajasthan/pali/bhinmal/news/less-installation-in-devi-temples-including-kshemankari-mata-temple-devotees-will-not-be-able-to-see-without-masks-127822740.html
 https://www.bhaskar.com/amp/news/latest-bhinmal-news-022502-1664182.html

Hindu temples in Rajasthan
Tourist attractions in Jalore district
Temples of Jalore District